Dikken Zwilgmeyer (20 September 1853 – 28 February 1913) was a Norwegian fiction writer. She is most noted for her children's literature and for her "Inger Johanne" series of books.

Personal life
Barbara Hendrikke Wind Daae Zwilgmeyer  was born in Trondheim, Norway. She was one of seven children born to  Peter Gustav Zwilgmeyer (1813–1887) and Margrethe Gjørvel Daae (1825-1887). Her father was  a Stipendiary magistrate and Member of the Norwegian Parliament. She and her family lived in Risør in Nedenes county from the time she was 8 years old. Her uncle Ludvig Daae was a politician and Minister of the Army. Her grandfather, Heinrich Carl Zwilgmeyer (1761-1850)  had immigrated to Norway from Hanover, Germany. She never married. She died at Kongsberg in Buskerud and was buried at Vår Frelsers gravlund in Oslo. .

Career

Zwilgmeyer had no formal education. She showed early talent for painting and writing, and took lessons with various painters, including Christian Krohg. Her first published story was "En Hverdagshistorie", printed in the magazine Nyt Tidsskrift in 1884. Her first story for children was "Afbrudt 17. mai", published in the magazine Illustreret Tidende for Børn.

Her first children's book was Vi børn from 1890. It written under the pseudonym  "Inger Johanne, 13 years old". Inger Johanne was described as the daughter of a judge in a small Norwegian town. This book became a great success, and eleven more "Inger Johanne" books followed. Among these are Karsten og jeg from 1891, Fra vor by from 1892, and Barndom from 1895. Anniken Præstgaren from 1900 is probably the book with largest audience. It is estimated that Zwilgmeyer's books were printed in 600,000 copies up to 1903. "Inger Johanne" remained a favourite for Norwegian children for generations, and Zwilgmeyer's books are regarded as a significant innovation of Norwegian children's literature around 1900.

In 1895 she published her first book for adults, the short story collection Som kvinder er, about the poor circumstances for unmarried women, and in 1896 the puberty novel Ungt sind. These books were more or less met with silence from the contemporary literary critic. The collection Som kvinder er was reissued in 1953, and then received as a forgotten literary pearl from the 1890s. In the 1900s she wrote historical novels and stories, including the collection Mægler Porsvold og andre historier from 1902, and the novels Emerentze (1906), Maren Ragna (1907) and Thekla (1908).

In an obituary from 1913, Sigrid Undset emphasized Zwilgmeyer's two faces, the nice children's writer and the more bitter critic of society.

What Happened to Inger Johanne was a compilation of short stories translated into English by American children's author Emilie Poulsson. Accompanied with illustrations by Florence Liley Young, the English language version was published in Boston in 1919.

Selected works
Vi børn   (We children),  1890
Karsten og jeg (Karsten and I), 1891  
Fra vor by (From our city), 1892  
Sommerferier (Summer holidays), 1894
Barndom  (Childhood), 1895 
Morsomme dage  (Funny days), 1896
Hos onkel Max og tante Betty  (With Uncle Max and Aunt Betty), 1897 
Udenlands   (Foreign), 1898
Fire kusiner (Four cousins), 1899
Anniken Prestgaren (Anniken the Prestige), 1900
Syvstjernen og andre historier  (Seven Star and Other Stories), 1900
Frøken Lybæks pensionatskole (Ms. Lybæk's boarding school), 1901
Lille Jan Bluhme (Little Jan Bluhme), 1903
Kongsgaardgutten (Kongsgaardgutten), 1904
Maja (Maja), 1905
Hos farfar paa Løvly (At grandfather at Løvly), 1910
Vi tre i hytten (We were in the cabin), 1911

References

Other sources
Harald S. Naess, editor  (1993)   A History of Norwegian Literature (University of Nebraska Press)

External links
 
 
 

1853 births
1913 deaths
People from Risør
Norwegian children's writers
19th-century Norwegian novelists
20th-century Norwegian novelists
Norwegian women novelists
Norwegian women children's writers
20th-century Norwegian women writers
19th-century Norwegian women writers
19th-century Norwegian writers
Norwegian people of German descent
Burials at the Cemetery of Our Saviour
People from Trondheim